William Irby, 1st Baron Boston (8 March 1707 – 30 March 1775) was a British peer and Member of Parliament.

Life
Irby was the son of Sir Edward Irby, 1st Baronet and inherited his father's baronetcy in 1718. On 26 August 1746, he married Albinia Selwyn and they had three children including:

 Augusta Georgina Elizabeth Irby (b. 15 July 1747).
 William Henry Irby (b. 29 August 1750).

Irby was a Page of Honour to King George I and King George II in the final and first few years of their reigns, respectively. He was also an equerry to Frederick, Prince of Wales from 1728 to 1736, Vice-Chamberlain to the Prince's wife, Augusta from 1736 to 1751 and her Lord Chamberlain from 1751 to 1772.

Irby was also MP for Launceston from 1735 to 1747 and for Bodmin from 1747 to 1761. In 1761 he was raised to the peerage as Baron Boston, of Boston in the County of Lincoln, and became Lord of the Manor of Hedsor in 1764.

He died in 1775, aged 68 and was buried in Whiston, Northamptonshire.

References

External links 
Hedsor House – The Seat of the Boston's

1707 births
1775 deaths
1
Peers of Great Britain created by George III
Irby, William
Irby, William
British MPs 1734–1741
British MPs 1741–1747
British MPs 1747–1754
British MPs 1754–1761
Pages of Honour
Irby, William